Philippine Trust Company, commonly known as Philtrust Bank, is one of the oldest private universal banks in the Philippines. Founded on October 16, 1916, its history parallels the growth of the  Philippine banking system.  It is the third bank to be established in the Philippines, after Bank of the Philippine Islands and Philippine National Bank.  The bank is one of the businesses that was owned by Chinese-Filipino businessman, Emilio Yap.

As of December 16, 2010, Philtrust Bank has a total market capitalization of P40.6 billion and share price of P70.00.

As of March 31, 2012, it has Total Assets of R103.767 Billion, Total Deposits of R87.628 Billion, Total Net Worth of R15.431 Billion, Total Paid-Up Capital of R10 Billion with Authorized Capital Stock of R22 Billion.
To date, Philtrust Bank has a total of 40 branches in Metro Manila and 21 provincial branches.

History

Philtrust Bank was established in 1916 as the first bank to engage in trust business, still non-existent in the early 1900s despite the increasing demand for estate administration and guardianship services. The bank started with just one million authorized capital stocks, half of which was paid up.

Even the Office of the United States Veterans Administration, then known as the Veterans Bureau, engaged Philippine Trust Company to handle guardianship of deceased Veteran's children. Among the customers of Philtrust Bank was Gen. Douglas MacArthur.

After World War Two, the government, through the Rehabilitation Finance Corporation infused fresh capital. The bank’s authorized capital stock was increased to P3 million, of which, P2 million was paid-up between existing shareholders and the RFC.

In 1978, several parties expressed interest in acquiring controlling interest and approached the Roman Catholic Archbishop of Manila (RCAM), the principal stockholder of Philtrust Bank then. The late Jaime Cardinal Sin eventually decided to sell the stake to Emilio T. Yap because he believed that Yap “could maintain the trust and confidence of the Bank’s clients and would contribute greatly to the growth, stability and success of the Bank.”

On October 17, 1978, Yap took over Philtrust Bank and in 1988, Philtrust bank was listed in the Makati Stock Exchange and Manila Stock Exchange.

In 2007, the Bangko Sentral ng Pilipinas granted universal banking license to Philtrust Bank. The Philippines’ Securities and Exchange Commission also approved the registration of the Bank's Amended Articles of Incorporation, with powers among others, to engage in the business of expanded commercial banking as a universal bank, to carry on the business of a trust company, exercise the powers of investment houses as provided in pertinent laws and the power and authority to invest in the equity of allied and non-allied corporations, business or undertakings, and to perform such other acts and functions as may be permitted by law.

However, in 2009, Yap withdrew its bid saying the officers of Philtrust Bank are no longer interested in acquiring PBCom.

Branches

Binondo, Manila 
Departing from neoclassical style was the Art Nouveau Mariano Uy Chaco Building, now the Philtrust Building, designed by Samuel E. Rowell in 1914. The building was the headquarters of Uy Chaco and Sons, a hardware firm that imported and distributed American products locally. The six-storey structure, located at the northwestern corner of the former Plaza Cervantes, featured undulating balconies with elaborate wrought iron grilles set into its apex. Such organic patterns, shown in the ironworks and fluid curves exhibited in the balconies were the essential characteristics of the Art Nouveau style. The building possessed articulated bays totalling to eight; each consisted of an arch on the first floor and a slightly projecting, curved balcony on the third, fourth and fifth floors. The facade was broken at the sixth floor by an open circulation space accented by alternating narrow and wide, oval-shaped frames.

There is an ornamental, projecting turret crowned by a ribbed, eight-sided, bell-shaped cupola surfaced by iron tiles made to appear like shingles on the corner facing Plaza Cervantes. The turret doubled as a clock tower, with a series of clocks surrounding the circumference of the cupola’s base. The oldest-looking portion of the building’s facade was the first floor, as it evoked a Neo-Renaissance character with its stylized rusticated bands and stepped arches with false keystones.

Operations and Services

Its principal activities remain in commercial and investment banking services. Philtrust offers domestic, international and trust services.

Its domestic services offered are: savings, checking and time deposits, money market placements, business loans, remittances, transfer of funds and collections, safety deposit services and securities investments.

International transactions include: traveler's cheque, foreign exchange, Foreign Currency Deposit Unit transactions, commercial letters of credit, international remittances and collections.

They also provide trust operations and investment management: trust placement, investment management, estate administration / trustee of bond issues escrow services, administration of savings, insurance and pension plans, stock registry and transfer agent services.

Ownership 
Philtrust Realty Corporation: 26.90%
Seabreeze Enterprises: 19.47%
U.S. Automotive: 100
Orient Enterprises: 18.48%
Others (includes public stock): 15.77%

See also

BancNet
List of banks in the Philippines

References

External links 

Philtrust Bank
History of Philtrust Bank
Bankers Almanac

Banks established in 1916
Banks of the Philippines
Companies listed on the Philippine Stock Exchange
Companies based in Manila